USNS Soderman (T-AKR-317) is a Large, Medium-Speed Roll-on/Roll-off Ship (LMSR) and is part of the Military Sealift Command. The USNS Soderman is in the Preposition Program which stations ships across the world with military equipment. The Soderman is Watson-class vehicle cargo ship built by National Steel and Shipbuilding Company. The ship was launched on April 26, 2002 and put into service on the 24 of September 2002. The ship was named after Private First Class William A. Soderman, a Medal of Honor Recipient for World War II.

Naming

The USNS Soderman (T-AKR-317) is the second ship to be named after the Medal of Honor recipient William A. Soderman. The first ship has been renamed USNS GySgt. Fred W. Stockham (T-AK-3017) which is a Shughart-class container & roll-on roll-off. William A. Soderman was awarded the Medal of Honor for his heroism during World War II’s Battle of the Bulge. William Soderman received the Medal of Honor from President Harry S. Truman on the White House lawn, October 12, 1945. The wife of William Soderman, Virginia Soderman was there for the christening of the ship. Names for Navy ships traditionally have been chosen and announced by the Secretary of the Navy, under the direction of the President and in accordance with rules prescribed by Congress. For most of the 19th century, U.S. law included language explicitly assigning the Secretary of the Navy the task of naming new Navy ships.

Construction
The USNS Soderman is a Watson-class Large Medium-Speed Roll on, Roll off ship. The ship was designed and built by Nation Steel and Shipbuilding Company. The ship was laid down October 31, 2000 at NASCCO’s San Diego shipyard. The ship was launched on April 26, 2002 with fireworks and fanfare.

Hull Arrangement
The ship has berthing, recreation and office spaces for a crew of 30 people as well as room for more if a surge is required.

Propulsion Plant
The Soderman has two General Electric LM2500 gas turbines that make 64,000BHP and drive two 24’ controllable pitch propellers that turn at 95 RPM at full power. The ship has the capability of making 12,500 KW of electrical power for shipboard use. The emergency generator has a 2,000 KW capacity. The design speed of the ship is 24 knots with a range of 13,800 miles. The ship has bow thruster units.

Cargo System
The Soderman has a centerline stern slewing ramp as well as port and starboard side port ramps systems which can be used with the new Mobile Landing Platform or (MLP ships) that have just been built. The ship also has two single pedestal twin cranes. The Roll On / Roll Off decks are fixed to the ship as well as fixed and hinged ramps inside the cargo hold. The cargo holds also has environment control as well as foam firefighting and dewatering systems.

Mission and Operations

The mission of the USNS Soderman as part of the Combat Prepositioning Ships is to support the US Army. The CPS program prepositions enough ammunition, food, water, fuel, equipment, and other supplies to sustain elements of two U.S. Army Heavy divisions which may have up to 24,000 personnel for up to 30 days. The crew of the Soderman are civilian mariners and the ship is operated by the Navy’s Military Sealift Command. On October 4, 2012 the US Coast Guard used a MH-65C Dolphin helicopter to do a medical evacuation of a contractor aboard the USNS Soderman which was operating off the coast of Hawaii. In October 2013 the US Navy has awarded the crewing contract to Patriot Contract Services LLC. The contract is for all 8 Watson-class ships in the MSC inventory and is for a little over $63,000,000 a year. The contract includes four one year options which could bring the total amount of the contract to 330,000,000 by the end of September 2018.

References

External links
 
 Photo gallery at navsource.org

 

Watson-class vehicle cargo ships
Ships built in San Diego
2002 ships